The Battle of Togoruba took place on 15 March 1964, and was the first battle of the Eritrean War of Independence which involved the Ethiopian army instead of a Police unit. In the Battle, an Eritrean Liberation Front unit led by Mohamed Ali Idris was able to defeat the Ethiopian Army. The ELF suffered 19 dead, while the Ethiopian Army suffered 84 dead and many wounded.

Source

Eritrean War of Independence
Battles involving Ethiopia
Battles involving Eritrea